This is a list of episodes for the Comedy Central series Drunk History hosted by Derek Waters. A total of 70 episodes have aired over the course of 6 seasons.

Series overview

Web series episodes (2007–10)
In addition to the below web series episodes, the concept also appears as segments during HBO's Funny or Die Presents series.

Television series episodes

Season 1 (2013)

Season 2 (2014)

This season features three episodes ("American Music", "First Ladies", and "Sports Heroes") that are structured around themes instead of the typical city-focused format.

Season 3 (2015)
On July 25, 2014, Comedy Central announced that Drunk History was renewed for a third season. The third season premiered on September 1, 2015. This season, episodes featured locations like Miami, Las Vegas, Roswell, and New Orleans.

Season 4 (2016)

Season 5 (2018)

Season 6 (2019)

Specials

References

External links
 
 

Drunk History